Mária is a Hungarian and Slovak form of Maria (given name) or Mary (given name).

 The name is found in the Mária Valéria Bridge between Hungary and Slovakia on the middle of the bridge named after Archduchess Marie Valerie of Austria and may refer to:

 Mária Festetics (1839-1923), Austro-Hungarian Countess 
 Mária Frank (1943-1992), Hungarian swimmer 
 Mária Janák (born 1958), Hungarian javelin thrower
 Mari Jászai (1850-1926), Hungarian actress
 Mária Lázár (1895–1983), Hungarian actress
 Mária Littomeritzky (1927–2017), Hungarian butterfly swimmer
 Mária Mednyánszky (1901–1978), Hungarian international table tennis star
 Mária Mezei (1909–1983), Hungarian actress
 Mária Pap (born 1955), Hungarian athlete
 Marika Rökk (1913-2004), Hungarian dancer, singer and actress
 Mária Schmidt (born 1953), Hungarian historian and university lecturer
 Mária Sulyok (1908–1987), Hungarian actress
 Mária Szepes (1908-2007), Hungarian author
 Mária Tasnádi Fekete (1911–2001), Hungarian singer, stage and film actress
 Mária Temesi (born 1957), Hungarian operatic soprano
 Mari Törőcsik (1935–2021), Hungarian stage and film actress
 Mária Vadász (1950–2009), Hungarian handball player
 Mária Wittner (born 1937), Hungarian revolutionary and politician 
 Mária Zakariás (born 1952), Hungarian sprint canoer
 Mary of Hungary (1257 – 1323), daughter of Stephen V of Hungary
 Maria of Anjou (1371 – 1395) Queen of Hungary and Croatia 

Hungarian feminine given names
Slovak feminine given names